NBN or nbn may refer to:

Broadcasting networks
 National Black Network, US radio network
 National Broadcasting Network (Lebanon)
 National Broadcasting Network (Trinidad and Tobago)
 Nagoya Broadcasting Network, Japan
 Nanjing Broadcasting Network, China
 NBN Television, New South Wales, Australia
 People's Television Network, Philippines, formerly National Broadcasting Network

Organizations
 Bureau of Normalization, Belgium
 National Biodiversity Network, UK
NBN Co, aka nbn, Australian Government corporation responsible for National Broadband Network
 Nefesh B'Nefesh, Israeli organization encouraging immigration

Publications
 North by Northwestern, magazine of Northwestern University, US

Other
 Annobón Airport, Equatorial Guinea (IATA code)
 National Bingo Night (disambiguation), a game show in several countries
 National Bibliography Number, several publication identifier systems
 National Broadband Network, Australian national wholesale open-access data network
 New Brighton railway station, England, National Rail station code
 Nibrin, a protein
 Niobium nitride (NbN)

See also